Florent Mollet (born 19 November 1991) is a French professional footballer who plays as a midfielder for Ligue 1 club Nantes.

He made his professional debut for Dijon in Ligue 2 in 2012, and three years later joined fellow league team Créteil. In his only season for the latter, he scored 11 goals, but the team suffered relegation and he moved on to Metz in Ligue 1. Two years later, after his club was again relegated, he moved to Montpellier. In summer 2022, Mollet signed for Schalke 04 before moving to Nantes only half a year later.

Career

Dijon
Born in Fontaine-lès-Dijon, Côte-d'Or, Mollet began his career at local team Dijon. His first senior call-up was as an unused substitute on 20 May 2012, as his team concluded the Ligue 2 season with a 5–0 loss at Rennes.

He made his first appearance on 27 July, as the subsequent campaign began with a 1–0 win over Guingamp at the Stade Gaston Gérard. As a substitute, he scored in a penalty shootout on 7 August, as Dijon won at Châteauroux in the first round of the Coupe de la Ligue. On 11 January 2013, he scored his first goal, opening a 3–0 home win over Le Mans.

Mollet totalled four goals in 36 games in his first season, but did not scored in 39 league games for the rest of his time at the club. However, he scored seven goals in four games of the 2014–15 Coupe de France, including hat-tricks in consecutive away wins at Vichy (9–0) and 3 Rivières (6–1). On 4 January 2015, in the last 64 of the competition away to Ligue 1 team Caen, he scored the extra-time winner in a 3–2 victory.

Creteil
On 17 June 2015, Mollet and fellow midfielder Guillaume Loriot joined fellow Ligue 2 team Créteil. He made his debut on 31 July, starting as they began the season with a 1–0 win at fellow Île-de-France team Red Star. He scored a career-best 11 goals in 36 games for Les Béliers who were nonetheless relegated.

Metz
On 27 June 2016, Mollet was the seventh player signed by Metz ahead of their return to Ligue 1, signing a three-year deal with the club from Lorraine. He made his top-flight debut on 13 August, starting and playing 70 minutes of a 3–2 home win over Lille before being substituted for Ismaïla Sarr, having a 100% pass completion rate. On 14 December, he scored his first goal for the club to open a 1–1 home draw against Toulouse in the last 16 of the Coupe de la Ligue, as his team advanced 11–10 on penalties.

Having not scored at all in his first season at the Stade Saint-Symphorien, Mollet recorded his first top flight goal on 9 December 2017, opening a 1–1 home draw with Rennes. He added six more over the campaign, including two in a 6–3 loss at Marseille on 2 February 2018, as his team were relegated in last place.

Montpellier
On 11 July 2018, Mollet signed with Ligue 1 side Montpellier. He scored on his debut on 18 August away to Amiens, opening a 2–1 win. On 6 October, he was sent off in the first half of a 1–1 draw at Guingamp for sarcastically applauding the referee for booking him for a foul. Having achieved six goals in his first season, his initial three-year contract was extended by an undisclosed length.

In 2019–20, Mollet scored home and away against Dijon, taking four points from his hometown club. On 29 August 2020, he was sent off on video assistant referee review just before half time in a 2–1 loss at Rennes, for a boot to Faitout Maouassa's head.

On 7 April 2021, Mollet scored the only goal of a win at fourth-tier Voltigeurs de Châteaubriant to put Montpellier into the Coupe de France quarter-finals for the first time in nine years. He was sent off again on 16 May in a goalless draw at home to Brest, for a 39th-minute foul on Steve Mounie.

Schalke 04
On 8 June 2022, Mollet agreed to join Schalke 04, newly promoted to the Bundesliga, signing a three-year contract. The transfer fee paid to Montpellier was a reported €700,000, with an additional €800,000 in potential bonuses. He made his debut as a 58th-minute substitute for Alex Král on 31 July in a 5–0 win away to fourth-tier Bremer SV in the first round of the DFB-Pokal, and scored his first goal on 23 October by coming on and equalising in a 2–1 loss at Hertha BSC.

Nantes
On 17 January 2023, Mollet signed a two-and-a-half-year contract with Nantes. On 22 January 2023 he made his debut with canaries in a penalties away win against ES Thaon in Coupe de France. Seven days later, Mollet made his debut in Ligue 1 as a substitute of Ludovic Blas against Clermont Foot.

Career statistics

References

External links
 Florent Mollet at foot-national.com
 
 

1991 births
Living people
People from Fontaine-lès-Dijon
Sportspeople from Côte-d'Or
Footballers from Bourgogne-Franche-Comté
French footballers
Association football midfielders
Dijon FCO players
US Créteil-Lusitanos players
FC Metz players
Montpellier HSC players
FC Schalke 04 players
FC Nantes players
Championnat National 3 players
Ligue 2 players
Ligue 1 players
Bundesliga players
French expatriate footballers
Expatriate footballers in Germany
French expatriate sportspeople in Germany